Acute eosinophilic leukemia (AEL) is a rare subtype of acute myeloid leukemia with 50 to 80 percent of eosinophilic cells in the blood and marrow. It can arise de novo or may develop in patients having the chronic form of a hypereosinophilic syndrome. Patients with acute eosinophilic leukemia have a propensity for developing bronchospasm as well as symptoms of the acute coronary syndrome and/or heart failure due to eosinophilic myocarditis and eosinophil-based endomyocardial fibrosis. Hepatomegaly and splenomegaly are more common than in other variants of AML.

Diagnosis
A specific histochemical reaction, cyanide-resistant peroxidase, permits identification of leukemic blast cells with eosinophilic differentiation and diagnosis of acute eosinoblastic leukemia in some cases of AML with few identifiable eosinophils in blood or marrow.

Treatment and prognosis
when there is eosinophilia with increased immature precursors along with blasts; one need to identify lineage of blasts. As per old FAB classification most of the time blast lineage will be myeloid and may fall in M4EO of FAB classification. This entity need treatment like acute myeloid leukemia. However more rarely Eosinophilic leukemia may have underlying lymphoid blasts with t(5;14) (IL3;IGH). with this gene fusion and eosinophilic cytokine comes under control of immunoglobulin heavy chain (IgH) locus. This entity need treatment as ALL. Overall prognosis is not dependent on eosinophilia but underlying lineage and genetic abnormalities.

References

External links 

Acute myeloid leukemia